Father Jacques Monet, SJ, FRSC (born January 26, 1930) is a Canadian historian and Catholic priest.

Biography 
Born in Saint-Jean-d'Iberville, Quebec, Monet joined the Society of Jesus in 1949 and was ordained in 1966. He studied history at Université Laval and the University of Toronto, where he received a Ph.D. in History.

He joined the Department of History of the University of Ottawa in 1969 and was the chairman of the Department from 1972 to 1976. He left in 1980 to join Regis College, Toronto. He was President of the Canadian Historical Association from 1975 to 1976. He was also Rector of the University of Sudbury.

In 2012, Fr Monet was appointed to the Advisory Committee on Vice-Regal Appointments by Stephen Harper.

Selected bibliography 

 The Last Cannon Shot: A Study of French-Canadian Nationalism 1837-1850 (1969)
 The Canadian Crown (1979)
 Union of the Canadas 1837-1867 (1985)

References 

Canadian university and college chief executives
Historians from Quebec
20th-century Canadian Jesuits
Fellows of the Royal Society of Canada
Academic staff of the University of Ottawa
Université Laval alumni
University of Toronto alumni
Presidents of the Canadian Historical Association